Stephanie Morgenstern is a Canadian actress, filmmaker, and screenwriter for television and film. She has worked extensively on stage, film, and television in both English and French.  Her most widely seen feature film credits have been The Sweet Hereafter, Maelström, Julie and Me (Revoir Julie) and Forbidden Love. Morgenstern is also widely recognized by anime fans as the voice of Sailor Venus in the DIC Entertainment English dub of Sailor Moon in the first few seasons as well as the movies. Additionally, she provided the voice of Regina in the Dino Crisis series.

Life and career
Along with her writing partner and husband Mark Ellis, Morgenstern created Flashpoint, a Canadian TV police drama which premiered July 2008 on CTV and CBS, and ran for five years before the show ended by creative choice in 2012.  The show was awarded the Academy Board of Directors Tribute for Outstanding and Enduring Contribution to Canadian Television, in addition to both a Gemini and Canadian Screen Award for Best Dramatic Series. Flashpoint has been sold to over 50 countries outside of Canada and the U.S.

She and Mark Ellis were also co-creators and showrunners on X Company, a WWII espionage thriller set in France, Germany and Canada. Shot over three years in Budapest, it was also sold to many territories internationally, including France (TF1), U.K. (History), the United States (Ovation), Latin America (History), and Japan (Mystery). It was also a Canadian Screen Awards nominee for Best Dramatic Series.

Morgenstern has been twice nominated for Genie (Canadian Academy) Awards for directing the short film Remembrance, which she also co-wrote and co-starred in with her husband Mark Ellis, and co-directing (with her brother Mark Morgenstern) the short film Curtains, which she also wrote, an in which she played the lead role.

Morgenstern stated in a 2003 interview that she has synesthesia.  She is also a practitioner of Krav Maga martial arts training.

Filmography

Director and screenwriter credits

Acting

Television

References

External links

Official Website

Living people
Actresses from Montreal
Canadian film actresses
Canadian Screen Award winners
Canadian stage actresses
Canadian television actresses
Canadian television directors
Canadian television writers
Canadian video game actresses
Canadian voice actresses
Canadian women film directors
Canadian women screenwriters
Canadian women television directors
Canadian women television writers
Film directors from Montreal
Place of birth missing (living people)
Writers from Montreal
Year of birth missing (living people)
York University alumni
20th-century Canadian actresses
21st-century Canadian actresses
20th-century Canadian women writers
21st-century Canadian women writers